Herbert Alsen (sometimes Ahlsen) (12 October 1906 – 25 October 1978 was a German operatic bass of formidable volume and stature.

Biography
Alsen debuted as Rocco in Fidelio in Westfalen. In 1936, he performed as the Commendatore in Mozart's Don Giovanni under Bruno Walter, and as Pogner the goldsmith in Wagner's Die Meistersinger von Nürnberg under Arturo Toscanini. Basing his career in Vienna, he went on to play all the great Wagner bass roles, including Gurnemanz, Hunding, Fafner, King Marke and Hagen, and more than forty roles by other composers. He sang at the Metropolitan Opera in the 1938–9 season. He retired in 1958.

Recordings are available of his Hunding, Pogner, and Fafner; also Rocco, Banco, Commendatore (opposite Ezio Pinza), Sarastro, and Osmin (opposite Elisabeth Schwarzkopf). An anthology CD is also available. There are no published recordings of his Hagen.

Notes and references

Sources
"Herbert Alsen". Classical Artist Biographies. All Media Guide, 2009. (Answers.com 10 December 2009).
Norbeck, Peters & Ford, Herbert Alsen (Preiser 90579)

External links
 Formidable volume and stature

German operatic basses
1906 births
1978 deaths
Österreichischer Kammersänger
20th-century German male opera singers
People from Hildesheim
Humboldt University of Berlin alumni